StarWriter can refer to:

The Canon Inc. StarWriter, a typewriter with inkjet printhead produced by Canon.
StarOffice Writer, the word processor module in StarOffice, formerly known as StarWriter.